Noventa Padovana is a comune (municipality) in the Province of Padua in the Italian region Veneto, located about  west of Venice and about  east of Padua.

In the 13th century, the castle of Noventa Padovana was the residence of Isabella of England, the wife of emperor Frederick II.

Noventa's territory is characterized by numerous patrician villas from the 16th to 18th centuries, such as 
Villa Valmarana
Villa Giustiniani
Villa Saccomani
Villa Todeschini
Villa Manzoni
Villa Giovannelli Colonna

Twin towns
Noventa Padovana is twinned with:

  Municipality of Šoštanj, Slovenia, since 1984
  Umag, Croatia, since 1984

References

External links
 Official website

Cities and towns in Veneto